Valendas-Sagogn railway station is a station on the Reichenau-Tamins–Disentis/Mustér railway of the Rhaetian Railway in the Swiss canton of Graubünden. It is situated alongside the Anterior Rhine, and marks the upstream end of the railway's scenic passage through the Ruinaulta or Rhine Gorge. The station is located on the south bank of the river in the municipality of Safiental, and serves the villages of Valendas and Sagogn, which lie at higher elevations on either side of the gorge.

Services
The following services stop at Valendas-Sagogn:

Gallery

References

External links 
 
 

Safiental
Sagogn
Railway stations in Graubünden
Rhaetian Railway stations
Railway stations in Switzerland opened in 1903